Paul Marlowe (c. 1945 – 16 October 1976) was a Volunteer in the Provisional IRA's Belfast Brigade. He held the rank of Training Officer (T/O) when he and two other experienced Volunteers, Frank Fitzsimons and Joey Surgenor, were killed when a bomb they were planting exploded prematurely at Belfast gasworks in October 1976. Marlowe was 31 and had a wife and three children when he died.

Early life
Paul Marlowe was born in Ardoyne, in north Belfast, an Irish nationalist enclave surrounded by Loyalist areas in 1945. He moved to England in the early 1960s.
Marlowe joined the British Army sometime in the 1960s, and was a paratrooper who served with the SAS in both Malaysia during the Malayan Emergency and in Aden during the Aden crisis.

Irish Republican Army
Marlowe returned from England and joined the Irish Republican Army in 1969 sometime after the 1969 Northern Ireland riots in which Ardoyne was heavily attacked and two Catholic civilians (Samuel McLarnon, 27, and Michael Lynch, 28) were killed by machine-gun fire. Marlowe decided to side with the Provisional IRA when they split with the Official IRA in December 1969. He was a part of the Belfast Brigade's Third battalion which located around Ardoyne, the New Lodge and Ligoniel's area in north Belfast. He moved up the Brigade level fast because of his experience in the British Army and he helped to train new recruits.
He was interned for a short period in 1972 and quickly released. Marlowe was credited with developing the IRA's version of a Claymore mine.
After he was released from internment he became a member of the Belfast's Brigades 1st Battalion staff as a training officer. He was killed on 16 October 1976 when he and comrades Frank Fitzsimons (28) and Joey Surgenor (23) were planting a bomb at a Belfast gasworks on the Ormeau Road. The bomb exploded prematurely creating a huge explosion and killed the men instantly. All three men were very experienced Volunteers and had over 15 years of experience between the three of them. Surgenor was one of the Volunteers who helped Billy McKee defend the Short Strand in June 1970.
The three men's funerals took place on 20 October 1976 and they were buried in the Republican plot at Milltown Cemetery.

See also
 Provisional IRA Belfast Brigade
 Roy Walsh (Irish republican)
 Gerry Kelly
 Patricia Black

References

1945 births
1976 deaths
Paramilitaries from Belfast
People killed during The Troubles (Northern Ireland)
Prisoners accorded Special Category Status
Provisional Irish Republican Army members
Republicans imprisoned during the Northern Ireland conflict